At dawn of Sunday, July 30, 2017, Criminal Investigation and Detection Group (CIDG) and the Ozamiz City police conducted a simultaneous raid in the house of the Parojinogs in Ozamiz and other associated properties, leaving 15 persons killed, including incumbent Mayor Reynaldo Parojinog and his wife. Another member of the Parojinog family died in the hospital three days after the raid. Parojinog is the third mayor to be killed during the course of country's war on drugs after Rolando Espinosa of Albuera, Leyte eight months prior and Samsudin Dimaukom of Datu Saudi-Ampatuan, Maguindanao nine months prior.

Background
Reynaldo Parojinog was among the persons named by President Rodrigo Duterte on August 7, 2016, for alleged involvement in the illegal drug trade. However, Parojinog has denied any links to illegal drugs.

Incident
On July 30, 2017, 2:30am (PST), the encounter took place at several Parojinog's properties in Barangays Baybay San Roque and Baybay Santa Cruz. The Ozamiz City police and the Criminal Investigation Group (CIDG)-Region 10 issued six search warrants against city mayor Reynaldo "Aldong" Parojinog Sr. and two others - for reportedly storing guns in his house, as well as Vice Mayor Nova Princess Parojinog-Echavez, and City Councilor Ricardo “Ardot” Parojinog, the farm houses of Mayor Parojinog, Board Member Octavio "Avio" Parojinog Jr., and one other.

Senior Supt. Jaysen de Guzman, head of the Misamis Occidental provincial police office, said that before the CIDG was about to serve a warrant, the Parojinogs' security fired at them, prompting police to retaliate. Parojinogs' aide Jeffrey Ocang, however, denied that there had been an exchange of gunfire and said "the mayor's camp did not fire a shot." De Guzman said that the clash between the Parojinogs' men lasted two hours, and they managed to breach the mayor's house but were still met by the mayor's resistance. The authorities recovered an M79 rifle, grenades, .45 pistols, about P1.4 million in cash, 500 grams of suspected illegal drugs, two cellphones, and an M16 rifle in the Mayor's house. One shotgun, three rocket propelled grenade launchers, two hand grenades, eight M79 ammunition, and an M79 rifle were recovered from councilor Parojinog. A cellphone video, obtained by GMA News, was recorded during the raid showing Vice Mayor Nova Princess Parojinog-Echavez, Reynaldo's daughter, suddenly getting something from her bag while the police were conducting an inspection in her room inside her house. But the female police caught her doing something and they had to pry open her hands to get the item, which is packet with something white inside recovered from her hand. They immediately put the handcuff on her. The police found in the Parojinog-Echavez's home: 10 plastic sachets of crystal meth (“shabu”), 50 pieces of rolled aluminum foil, 500 pieces of P1,000 bills, 1,800 pieces of P500 bills, one M16 Blackwater rifle, one M16 magazine and 13 live ammunition for M16.

The resulting incident killed all 15 people including Reynaldo Parojinog Sr., his wife Susan, and his siblings Octavio Jr. and Mona. Parojinog-Echavez and her brother Reynaldo Jr., children of Reynaldo, were arrested and transferred to the national police headquarters at Camp Crame in Manila.

Aftermath
Ozamiz City police chief Jovie Espenido admitted in the media that they had destroyed the CCTV cameras installed in the house in order to protect the identities of the informants who helped them in the operation. However, Philippine National Police (PNP) chief Ronald dela Rosa states that the way of destroying the CCTV cameras are "wrong". Espenido recounted that the Philippine National Police conducted before dawn to avoid more casualties. Vice Mayor Parojinog-Echavez appealed to President Rodrigo Duterte and the Senate to investigate the deaths of 15 including four of her family members.

The Commission on Human Rights (CHR), on July 31, launched its investigation for the deaths of the Parojinog. Dela Rosa said that the death of the Parojinogs "serve as a warning to mayors with links to drugs" and the Mayors are warned not to fight back to the police when they knocked at their door. The Parojinog camp will file a case against the CIDG for lapsing the 36-hour validity of Nova Princess and Reynaldo Parojinog Jr., who should have been released from detention. The CIDG admitted they had encountered a problem in transporting the Parajinog siblings, thus causing the delay.

In an interview on ABS-CBN News, according to former hitman and drug courier known only as alias "Noel", many of his colleagues working for Parojinog gone missing and unable to get home. Noel was sent to Bilibid to get a kilogram of shabu to be delivered to Ozamiz and it was distributed to Reynaldo Parojinog, Sr. and her daughter Nova Princess.

On August 2, Senator Leila de Lima filed a resolution calling for a Senate investigation on the "suspicious" circumstances surrounding the Ozamiz raid. But, Senator Panfilo Lacson said that the Senate investigation will start only if the witnesses are available. Vice President Leni Robredo supported of the call for the investigation. Due to an ultimatum given by Espenido to barangay officials whom allegedly were given illegal firearms from the Parojinogs, left more than 300 firearms surrendered to the Police. A paraffin tests conducted by the Philippine National Police showed that eight (including Mayor Parojinog Sr. and his brother Octavio Jr.) of the 15 slain individuals were tested positive for gunpowder burns, indicating they engaged the police.

On August 4, the Department of Justice filed criminal cases against Parojinog siblings. Reynaldo Jr, faced cases of possession of dangerous drugs, illegal possession of firearms, ammunition, and explosives.

The motion filed by the Parojinog siblings to attend the wake of their parents and other family members on August 13 has been denied by Ozamiz Regional Trial Court. A drug test conducted on August 15 showed that the Parojinog siblings were tested negative in drug use.

Reynaldo's brother, Ricardo Parojinog was arrested in Taiwan on May 24, 2018 after 10 months of hiding. He was later found dead in his jail cell on September 4, 2020.

Disputed statements
The police statement of the raid incident have been disputed by the Parojinog family and its eyewitness:

Parojinog-Echavez said that the police "planted" the evidence of contraband that they seized, but the allegation was denied by de Guzman.

An unnamed survivor and a relative of the Parojinogs said in TV interviews that there was no exchange of gunfire as the police invades and started shooting everyone inside the mayor's house. Despite the insistence of the authorities that it is a legitimate operation, a mayor's neighbor said that it was a "massacre". One unidentified eyewitness appeared, said that the police thrown a grenade to the Parojinogs' men, but according to Espenido, a grenade exploded as a Parojinog bodyguard tried to toss it at the approaching police officers.

Another eyewitness named 'Joe', via the phone interview on ABS-CBN News, this time at the house of Councilor Ricardo 'Ardot' Parojinog, said that the police planted the explosives at the house while drug paraphernalia planted at his room.

Reactions
Senate Minority Leader Franklin Drilon expressed concern over the death of Mayor Parojinog. He stressed that the circumstances of the incident are similar to the fate of Albuera, Leyte Mayor Rolando Espinosa, who was killed in November 2016. Drilon states that:

However, it clearly states that the search warrant could serve anytime.

Senator Panfilo Lacson said that "at least" the Parojinogs were not killed while inside a detention facility. Lacson also said that Octavio "Ongkoy" Parojinog Sr., the father of Mayor Parojinog, city councilor Ricardo, and board member Octavio Jr., was the founder of Kuratong Baleleng, an organized crime syndicate based in Mindanao. On August 1, de Lima, through the handwritten statement, said that the raid were “massacre” and a “plain and simple extermination” of Duterte's former comrades in vigilantism. Senator Antonio Trillanes, a Duterte critic, described the killings as a “rub-out”, stating it is another proof of how Duterte's policy flouts human rights, due process and the rule of law and further reinforces the crime cases filed against him. Magdalo Party-list Rep. and another Duterte critic, Gary Alejano called the raid "highly suspicious".

See also
 Philippine Drug War
 Death of Rolando Espinosa
 Rodrigo Duterte's August 7, 2016 speech

Notes

References

2017 in the Philippines
2017 crimes in the Philippines
Philippine Drug War
Law enforcement in the Philippines
July 2017 events in the Philippines
Duterte administration controversies